The Liesing, sometimes also called the Liesingbach, is a  river in the Leoben District of Upper Styria in central Austria. It is a left tributary of the Mur.

See also 
 Enns (river)
 List of rivers of Austria

References 

Rivers of Austria
Liesing